Confessions of a Shopaholic may refer to:

 The Secret Dreamworld of a Shopaholic, the first in the Shopaholic series of novels, also known as Confessions of a Shopaholic
 Confessions of a Shopaholic (film), a 2009 American romantic comedy film based on the Shopaholic series of novels